The Scania F series is a line of front-engined bus chassis built by Scania. 

F series
Bus chassis